There are several rivers named Dos Bois River in Brazil:

 Dos Bois River (Crixás Açu River tributary)
 Dos Bois River (Das Almas River tributary)
 Dos Bois River (Paranaíba River)

See also
 DOS BIOS